Irakliy Geperidze (born 14 February 1987) is a Georgian former professional football player. He also holds Russian citizenship.

External links
Player profile by the Russian Football National League

1987 births
People from Gulripshi District
Living people
Footballers from Georgia (country)
Expatriate footballers from Georgia (country)
Expatriate footballers in Israel
Expatriate footballers in Cyprus
Expatriate footballers in Russia
Expatriate footballers in Armenia
Israeli Premier League players
Russian Premier League players
Cypriot First Division players
PFC Spartak Nalchik players
FC Torpedo Moscow players
Hapoel Petah Tikva F.C. players
Hapoel Haifa F.C. players
Maccabi Herzliya F.C. players
AEP Paphos FC players
Liga Leumit players
FC Armavir players
Association football midfielders
FC Saturn Ramenskoye players
FC Moscow players
FC Lokomotiv Moscow players
FC Spartak Nizhny Novgorod players